Bermecke may refer to three different rivers of North Rhine-Westphalia, Germany:
 Bermecke (Heve), drained by the Bache/Lottmannshardbach, Heve, Möhne
 Lütte Bermecke, right tributary of the Bermecke (Heve)
 Bermecke (Möhne), left tributary of the Möhne